The 2005–06 Indiana Hoosiers men's basketball team represented Indiana University in the 2005–06 college basketball season. Their head coach was Mike Davis, in his sixth and final season in charge of the Hoosiers. The team played its home games at Assembly Hall in Bloomington, Indiana, and was a member of the Big Ten Conference.

Indiana finished the season with an overall record of 19–12 and a conference record of 9–7, good for 4th place in the Big Ten Conference. After beating Wisconsin in the quarterfinals, the Hoosiers fell to Ohio State in the semifinal of the Big Ten tournament. The Hoosiers then defeated San Diego State Aztecs in the first round of the NCAA tournament before losing to the Gonzaga Bulldogs in the second round. That game would end the season for the Hoosiers, and be the final game at IU for Mike Davis. Coach Davis resigned at the end of the season and in April he accepted the head coaching position at UAB. Davis was replaced by Oklahoma head coach Kelvin Sampson.

2005–06 Roster

Schedule and results

|-
!colspan=9| Regular Season
|-

|-
!colspan=9| Big Ten tournament

|-
!colspan=9| NCAA tournament

References

Indiana Hoosiers
Indiana Hoosiers men's basketball seasons
Indiana
2005 in sports in Indiana
2006 in sports in Indiana